The  is an AC electric multiple unit (EMU) tilting train type operated on Sonic limited express services by Kyushu Railway Company (JR Kyushu) in Japan since April 1995.

Design
The trains were built by Hitachi.

Formations
The fleet was initially formed as five 7-car sets (AO1–5) and three 5-car sets (AO6–8), with the three 5-car sets having different coloured front ends: silver for AO6, yellow for A07, and dark blue for AO8. The 5-car sets were lengthened to 7 cars from July 2008 with the insertion of two -1000 subseries cars with aluminium bodies built to 885 series specifications.

Sets AO1–5
These sets are formed as follows.

Cars 2, 4, and 6 are each fitted with one PS401KA single-arm pantograph.

Sets AO16–18
These sets are formed as follows.

Cars 2, 4, and 6 are each fitted with one PS401KA single-arm pantograph.

History

The first trains entered service from 20 April 1995.

All cars were made no-smoking from the start of the revised timetable on 18 March 2007.

References

Electric multiple units of Japan
Kyushu Railway Company
Train-related introductions in 1995
Hitachi multiple units
Tilting trains
20 kV AC multiple units